Mesopotamia is the historical region between the Tigris and Euphrates rivers, largely corresponding with the territory of modern Iraq.

Mesopotamia may also refer to:

Places

Middle East
Geographically, the Tigris-Euphrates river system
Upper Mesopotamia
Lower Mesopotamia
Mesopotamia (Roman province), a Roman province extant in the 2nd through 7th centuries
Mesopotamia (theme), a Byzantine province extant in the 10th and 11th centuries
Mandatory Mesopotamia, the geopolitical entity created in Mesopotamia (Iraq) under British administration in 1920–1921

Other locations
Mesopotamia, Argentina, the name of the northeast region of Argentina located between the rivers Paraná and Uruguay
Mesopotamia, Antioquia, a district in La Unión municipality in Antioquia Department, Colombia.
Mesopotamia Township, Trumbull County, Ohio, United States
Mesopotam, a village in Albania
Mesopotamia, Greece, a municipality in Greece
Mesopotamia, New Zealand, an area at the head of the Rangitata River
Mesopotamia Station, a historic high country farm at Mesopotamia, New Zealand
Mesopotamia, Oxford, the name of land between two rivers in the Oxford University Parks, England
Mesopotamia, Saint Vincent and the Grenadines, a village in Saint Vincent and the Grenadines
Mesopotamia (Belize House constituency), a Belize City-based electoral constituency

In popular culture
Mesopotamia (EP), an EP by The B-52's; or the title track of that album
"Mesopotamia", the first track from the album Cruel Melody by Black Light Burns
"The Mesopotamians", the last track in the album The Else by They Might Be Giants

Other uses
Mesopotamian crow, a bird native to the region of Mesopotamia
"Mesopotamia", the Japanese name for the 1991 video game Somer Assault